Randeria is a surname. Notable people with the surname include: 

Mohit Randeria (born 1958), US-based Indian physicist
Shalini Randeria, Indian anthropologist
Siddharth Randeria (born 1955), Indian actor